Cheadle is a borough constituency represented in the House of Commons of the Parliament of the United Kingdom.

It elects one Member of Parliament (MP) by the first-past-the-post voting system.

It is a marginal seat between the Conservatives and the Liberal Democrats. From 1970 until 2001, it was held by the Conservatives, after which it was held by the Liberal Democrats from 2001 until the 2015 general election, when it was taken back by the Conservatives.

History 
Cheadle was created as a county constituency under the Representation of the People Act 1948, for the 1950 general election. it covered a predominantly urban and relatively affluent area in the south-eastern suburbs of the Manchester conurbation.

The growth of the suburbs of Manchester led to a rapidly rising electorate from the late 1950s and by the 1970 election there were 107,225 electors and some reduction was inevitable. At the February 1974 general election the seat was re-classified as a borough constituency and split in two, with the eastern parts forming the new Hazel Grove constituency.

As a result of changes to the county boundaries which came into effect on 1 April 1974, the constituency crossed between Greater Manchester and Cheshire. Realigning with the county boundaries in 1983, the constituency was redrawn, losing Wilmslow to Tatton, whilst gaining back Bramhall from Hazel Grove.

Boundaries 

1950–1955: The Urban Districts of Bredbury and Romiley, Cheadle and Gatley, Hazel Grove and Bramhall, and Marple.

Cheadle and Gatley previously part of the abolished constituency of Bucklow, Hazel Grove and Bramhall transferred from Knutsford, and Bredbury, Romiley and Marple transferred from Macclesfield.  Also included Mellor (now part of the Urban District of Marple), which was previously in the Derbyshire constituency of High Peak.

1955–1974: As above except the part of Bredbury ward added to the County Borough of Stockport by the Stockport (Extension) Order 1952, which was transferred to Stockport South (Statutory Instrument 1953–742).

1974–1983: The Urban Districts of Cheadle and Gatley, and Wilmslow.

The majority of the constituency was hived off to form Hazel Grove, leave just Cheadle and Gatley. Partly compensated by the transfer of Wilmslow from Macclesfield.

From 1 April 1974 until the next boundary review came into effect for the 1983 general election, the constituency comprised parts of the Metropolitan Borough of Stockport in Greater Manchester (Cheadle and Gatley) and parts of the expanded Borough of Macclesfield in Cheshire (Wilmslow), but its boundaries were unchanged.

1983–2010: The Borough of Stockport wards of Cheadle, Cheadle Hulme North, Cheadle Hulme South, East Bramhall, Heald Green, and West Bramhall.

Wilmslow included in the new constituency of Tatton in Cheshire, with smaller parts transferred to Macclesfield and Stockport,  Bramhall transferred from Hazel Grove.

2010–present: The Borough of Stockport wards of Bramhall North, Bramhall South, Cheadle and Gatley, Cheadle Hulme North, Cheadle Hulme South, Heald Green, and Stepping Hill.

Boundaries adjusted to take account of revision of local authority wards.

Members of Parliament 
The current MP is the Conservative Mary Robinson, who defeated Mark Hunter at the 2015 general election.

From 1974, (when half of the seat was split off to create the Hazel Grove constituency), Cheadle had safe Conservative majorities until the 1997 election, when the Liberal Democrats reduced the margin to around 3,000 votes. Patsy Calton scraped home in 2001 by a majority of 33 votes, the narrowest in the House of Commons, but returned with a much safer 4,000 votes in 2005. She died on 29 May 2005, triggering a by-election in July 2005, where Mark Hunter was elected with a majority of 3,657. Although held by Hunter in 2010, the Conservatives regained the seat in 2015 and held it in 2017 and 2019, albeit with reduced majorities on each occasion.

Elections

Elections in the 2010s

Elections in the 2000s

Elections in the 1990s 
The Cheadle constituency underwent minor boundary changes after the 1992 general election and as such the change in share of vote is based on a notional calculation.

Elections in the 1980s 

The boundaries of the constituency changed in 1983. Changes in the vote are based on the estimated results for 1979 had the 1983 boundaries been in operation then.

Elections in the 1970s 

After the 1970 general election, boundary changes created the Hazel Grove constituency which reduced the size of the Cheadle one. The previous Member of Parliament for Cheadle, Dr Michael Winstanley became the first member returned by Hazel Grove.

Elections in the 1960s

Elections in the 1950s

See also 
 List of parliamentary constituencies in Greater Manchester
History of parliamentary constituencies and boundaries in Cheshire

References

Sources

Election result, 2005
Election results, 1997 – 2001 
Election results, 1983 – 1992
Election results, 1959 – 2001
 F.W.S. Craig. British Parliamentary Election Results 1950–1973.

External links 
nomis Constituency Profile for Cheadle — presenting data from the ONS annual population survey and other official statistics.

Parliamentary constituencies in Greater Manchester
Politics of the Metropolitan Borough of Stockport
Constituencies of the Parliament of the United Kingdom established in 1950
Cheadle, Greater Manchester